The AnMed Health Women's and Children's Hospital is a 72-bed facility and one of three hospitals in the AnMed Health system. The health system's other two licensed hospitals are the AnMed Health Medical Center and the AnMed Health Rehabilitation Hospital. The Women's and Children's Hospital is located at the AnMed Health North Campus at 2000 E. Greenville St. in Anderson, SC.

More than 2,000 births occur each year at the Women's and Children's Hospital. The hospital has a Level II Nursery, which cares for premature newborns at 32 weeks of gestation and full-term newborns with breathing difficulties, jaundice or other medical conditions. Other hospital services include women's surgery, diagnostic imaging and pediatric care.

External links
 AnMed Health Homepage

Hospitals in South Carolina
Anderson, South Carolina
Buildings and structures in Anderson County, South Carolina
Women's hospitals
Children's hospitals in the United States
Atrium Health
Women in South Carolina